

Deaths in July

 31: Bobby Robson
 25: Vernon Forrest
 19: Henry Surtees
 18: Ricardo Londoño
 11: Arturo Gatti
 4: Steve McNair
 1: Alexis Argüello

Current sporting seasons

Australian rules football 2009

Australian Football League

Auto racing 2009

Formula One
Sprint Cup
IRL IndyCar Series
World Rally Championship
Formula Two
Nationwide Series
Camping World Truck Series
GP2
WTTC
V8 Supercar
American Le Mans
Le Mans Series
Superleague Formula
Rolex Sports Car Series
FIA GT Championship
Formula Three
World Series by Renault
Deutsche Tourenwagen Masters
Super GT

Baseball 2009

Major League Baseball
Nippon Professional Baseball

Basketball 2009

WNBA

Philippine collegiate:
NCAA
UAAP

Canadian football 2009

Canadian Football League

Football (soccer) 2009

National teams competitions
2010 FIFA World Cup Qualifying
International clubs competitions
UEFA (Europe) Champions League
Europa League

AFC (Asia) Champions League
CAF (Africa) Champions League
CONCACAF (North & Central America) Champions League

Domestic (national) competitions

Brazil

Japan
Norway
Russia

Major League Soccer (USA & Canada)
Women's Professional Soccer (USA)

Golf 2009

European Tour
PGA Tour
LPGA Tour
Champions Tour

Lacrosse 2009

Major League Lacrosse

Motorcycle racing 2009

Superbike World Championship
Supersport racing

Rugby league 2009

Super League
NRL

Rugby union 2009

Currie Cup
Air New Zealand Cup

Volleyball

World Grand Prix

Days of the month

July 31, 2009 (Friday)

Baseball
Major League Baseball trades made before the 4 p.m. EDT trading deadline:
The Chicago White Sox get pitcher Jake Peavy from the San Diego Padres for four pitching prospects.
Catcher Víctor Martínez goes from the Cleveland Indians to the Boston Red Sox for pitcher Justin Masterson and two minor league pitchers.
In a trade of first basemen, Adam LaRoche goes to the Red Sox in exchange for Casey Kotchman of the Atlanta Braves and cash.
The Minnesota Twins acquire shortstop Orlando Cabrera and cash from the Oakland Athletics in exchange for infielder prospect Tyler Ladendorf.
Pitcher Jarrod Washburn is dealt from the Seattle Mariners to the Detroit Tigers for pitcher Luke French and minor league pitcher Mauricio Robles.
The New York Yankees acquire utility infielder Jerry Hairston Jr. from the Cincinnati Reds for minor league catcher Chase Weems.

Cricket
Australia in England:
The Ashes Series:
3rd Test in Birmingham, day 2:
 263 (James Anderson 5/80);  116/2 (36.0 ov). England trail by 147 runs with 8 wickets remaining in the 1st innings.
Bangladesh in West Indies:
3rd ODI in Basseterre, St Kitts:
 248 (47.4 ov);  249/7 (48.5 ov). Bangladesh win by 3 wickets, and win 3-match series 3–0.

Cycling 
UCI Women's Road World Cup
Open de Suède Vårgårda Team Time Trial:   (Kristin Armstrong, Regina Bruins, Carla Ryan, Christiane Soeder, Kirsten Wild, Sarah Düster)   (Kimberly Anderson, Chantal Beltman, Emilia Fahlin, Ina-Yoko Teutenberg, Ellen van Dijk, Linda Villumsen)  Team Flexpoint (Susanne Ljungskog, Mirjam Melchers, Loes Gunnewijk, Loes Markerink, Trine Schmidt, Iris Slappendel)

Football (soccer)
CAF Champions League group stage, matchday 2:
Group A:
Al-Hilal  1–0  ZESCO United

Golf
Women's majors:
Women's British Open in Lytham St Annes, England, second round:
Leaderboard: (1) Catriona Matthew  & Giulia Sergas  141 (−3) (3) Yuko Mitsuka  142 (−2)
Senior majors:
U.S Senior Open in Carmel, Indiana, second round:
Leaderboard: (1) Tim Jackson  133 (−11) (2) Joey Sindelar  134 (−10) (3) Fred Funk  135 (−9)

Swimming
World Aquatics Championships in Rome, Italy:
Women's 100m freestyle:
Men's 200m backstroke:
 Aaron Peirsol  1:51.92   Ryosuke Irie  1:52.51  Ryan Lochte  1:53.82
Women's 200m breaststroke:
 Nađa Higl  2:21.62 ER  Annamay Pierse  2:21.84  Mirna Jukić  2:21.97
Men's 200m breaststroke:
Men's 4 × 200 m freestyle relay:
  (Michael Phelps, Ricky Berens, Dave Walters, Ryan Lochte) 6:58.55    (Nikita Lobintsev, Michail Polishuk, Danila Izotov, Alexander Sukhorukov) 6:59.15 ER   (Kenrick Monk, Robert Hurley, Tommaso D'Orsogna, Patrick Murphy) 7:01.65 OC

Volleyball
FIVB World Grand Prix:
1st Preliminary Round:
Pool A in Rio de Janeiro, Brazil:
 3–0 
 3–0 
Pool B in Kielce, Poland:
 2–3 
 0–3 
Pool C in Ningbo, China:
 3–0 
 3–0

Water polo
World Aquatics Championships in Rome, Italy:
Women:
Bronze Medal Match:   10–9 
Gold Medal Match:   6–7

July 30, 2009 (Thursday)

Baseball

Cricket
Australia in England:
The Ashes Series:
3rd Test in Birmingham, day 1:
 126/1 (30 ov)
Pakistan in Sri Lanka:
1st ODI in Dambulla:
 232/9 (50 overs);  196 (44.4 overs). Sri Lanka win by 36 runs, lead 5-match series 1–0.

Football (soccer)
UEFA Under-19 Championship in Ukraine:
Semifinals:
 3–1 (a.e.t.) 
 1–3

Golf
Women's majors:
Women's British Open in Lytham St Annes, England, first round:
(1) Sandra Gal  69 (−3) (2) Song-Hee Kim  & Angela Stanford  70 (−2)
Senior majors:
U.S. Open in Carmel, Indiana, third round:
Leaderboard: (1) Dan Forsman, Tim Jackson, Joey Sindelar (all United States) & Greg Norman  66 (−6)

Swimming
World Aquatics Championships in Rome, Italy:
Men's 200m individual medley:
Men's 100m freestyle:
Women's 200m butterfly:
Women's 50m backstroke:
Women's 4 × 200 m freestyle relay:

July 29, 2009 (Wednesday)

Auto racing
 Seven-time Formula One champion Michael Schumacher announces that he will come out of retirement to serve as Ferrari's substitute driver for Felipe Massa, who was seriously injured in an accident during qualifying for the Hungarian Grand Prix. (AP via ESPN)

Baseball
The Philadelphia Phillies acquire 2009 American League Cy Young Award winner Cliff Lee from the Cleveland Indians for outfielder Ben Francisco and four minor league prospects. (AP via Yahoo)

Football (soccer)
 2009 MLS All-Star Game in Sandy, Utah:
 MLS All-Stars 1–1 (aet)  Everton. Everton wins 4–3 on penalties.

Swimming
World Aquatics Championships in Rome, Italy:
Men's 200m butterfly:  Michael Phelps  1:51.51 WR  Paweł Korzeniowski  1:53.23  Takeshi Matsuda  1:53.32
Women's 200m freestyle:  Federica Pellegrini  1:52.98 WR  Allison Schmitt  1:54.96  Dana Vollmer  1:55.64
Men's 50m breaststroke:  Cameron van der Burgh  26.67 WR  Felipe França Silva  26.76  Mark Gangloff  26.86
Men's 800m freestyle:  Zhang Lin  7:32.12 WR  Oussama Mellouli  7:35.27  Ryan Cochrane  7:41.92
Men's 100m freestyle semifinals: (1) Alain Bernard  47.27
Men's 200m individual medley semifinals: (1) Ryan Lochte  & László Cseh  1:55.18
Women's 50m backstroke semifinals: (1) Anastasia Zuyeva  27.38 WR
Women's 200m butterfly semifinals: (1) Katinka Hosszú  2:04.27

July 28, 2009 (Tuesday)

American football
 Brett Favre, who was considering coming out of retirement for the second consecutive season and playing for the Minnesota Vikings, announces that he will remain retired, saying that he does not feel physically able to play for a full season. (ESPN)

Cricket
Bangladesh in West Indies:
2nd ODI in Roseau, Dominica:
 274/6 (50 ov, Travis Dowlin 100*);  276/7 (49 ov). Bangladesh win by 3 wickets, lead 3-match series 2–0.

Swimming
World Aquatics Championships in Rome, Italy:
Men's 200m freestyle:
Women's 100m backstroke:
Women's 1500m freestyle:
Men's 100m backstroke:
Women's 100m breaststroke:
Men's 50m breaststroke semifinals:
Men's 200m butterfly semifinals:
Women's 200m freestyle semifinals:
Men's 800m freestyle semifinals:

July 27, 2009 (Monday)

American football
 NFL commissioner Roger Goodell conditionally reinstates Michael Vick following the end of his prison sentence for running a dog fighting operation. Vick will be allowed to play in preseason games and practice, provided he can find a team that will sign him, and Goodell will decide on Vick's full reinstatement no later than Week 6 of the 2009 season. (ESPN)

Football (soccer)
UEFA Under-19 Championship in Ukraine: (teams in bold advance to the semifinals)
Group A:
 0–1 
 1–7 
Standings: England, Ukraine 5 points, Switzerland 4, Slovenia 1.
Group B:
 0–1 
 1–0 
Standings: Serbia 7 points, France 5, Spain 3, Turkey 1.
Transfer News:
FC Barcelona and Internazionale complete a major deal, with Samuel Eto'o joining Inter and Zlatan Ibrahimović joining Barça. The deal was initially reported to also include a loan of Alexander Hleb to Inter, but Hleb turned down the move.

Golf
PGA Tour:
RBC Canadian Open in Oakville, Ontario:
Winner: Nathan Green  270 (−18) PO
 Green defeats Retief Goosen  on the second playoff hole for his first PGA Tour win.

Swimming
World Aquatics Championships in Rome, Italy, day 2:
Men's 100m breaststroke:  Brenton Rickard  58.58 WR  Hugues Duboscq  58.64  Cameron van der Burgh  58.95
Women's 100m butterfly:  Sarah Sjöström  56.06 WR  Jessicah Schipper  56.23  Jiao Liuyang  56.86
Men's 50m butterfly:  Milorad Čavić  22.67 CR  Matt Targett  22.73  Rafael Muñoz  22.88
Women's 200m individual medley:  Ariana Kukors  2:06.15 WR  Stephanie Rice  2:07.03  Katinka Hosszú  2:07.46
Men's 100m backstroke semifinals: (1) Junya Koga  52.39 CR
Women's 100m breaststroke semifinals: (1) Rebecca Soni  1:04.84 WR
Women's 100m backstroke semifinals: (1) Anastasia Zuyeva  58.48 WR
Men's 200m freestyle semifinals: (1) Paul Biedermann  1:43.65 CR

July 26, 2009 (Sunday)

Auto racing
Formula One:
Hungarian Grand Prix in Mogyoród, Hungary:
(1) Lewis Hamilton  (McLaren–Mercedes) 1:38:23.876 (2) Kimi Räikkönen  (Ferrari) +11.529 (3) Mark Webber  (Red Bull–Renault) +16.886
Drivers' standings (after 10 of 17 races): (1) Jenson Button  (Brawn–Mercedes) 70 points (2) Webber 51.5 (3) Sebastian Vettel  (Red Bull-Renault) 47
Constructors' standings: (1) Brawn-Mercedes 114 (2) Red Bull-Renault 98.5 (3) Ferrari 40
Sprint Cup Series:
Allstate 400 at the Brickyard in Speedway, Indiana:
 (1) Jimmie Johnson  (Chevrolet, Hendrick Motorsports) (2) Mark Martin  (Chevrolet, Hendrick Motorsports) (3) Tony Stewart  (Chevrolet, Stewart Haas Racing)
Drivers' standings (after 20 of 26 races leading to the Chase for the Sprint Cup): (1) Stewart 3054 points (2) Johnson 2862 (3) Jeff Gordon  2847 (Chevrolet, Hendrick Motorsports)
IndyCar Series:
Rexall Edmonton Indy in Edmonton, Alberta:
(1) Will Power  (Penske Racing) 1:42:42.3773 (2) Hélio Castroneves  (Penske Racing) + 1.0936* (3) Scott Dixon  (Chip Ganassi Racing) + 1.3213
Drivers' standings (after 11 of 17 races): (1) Dixon 380 points (2) Dario Franchitti  (Chip Ganassi Racing) 377 points (3) Ryan Briscoe  (Penske Racing) 366

Cricket
Bangladesh in West Indies:
1st ODI in Roseau, Dominica:
 246/9 (50 ov);  194 (43.4 ov). Bangladesh win by 52 runs, lead 3-match series 1–0.

Cycling
Tour de France:
Stage 21 – Montereau-Fault-Yonne to Paris Champs-Élysées (160 km): (1) Mark Cavendish  (Team Columbia–HTC) 4h 02' 18" (2) Mark Renshaw  (Team Columbia–HTC) same time (3) Tyler Farrar  (Garmin–Slipstream) s.t.
Cavendish wins his sixth stage of this year's Tour, the first rider in 30 years that does this feat.
Final standings:
General classification: (1)  Alberto Contador  85h 48' 35" (2) Andy Schleck  + 4' 11" (3) Lance Armstrong  (Astana) + 5' 24"
Points standing: (1)  Thor Hushovd  (Cervélo TestTeam) 280 points (2) Mark Cavendish  (Team Columbia–HTC) 270 (3) Gerald Ciolek  (Team Milram) 172
King of mountains standings: (1)  Franco Pellizotti  (Liquigas) 210 points (2) Egoi Martínez  135 (3) Contador 126

Football (soccer)
CONCACAF Gold Cup in United States:
Final in East Rutherford, New Jersey:
 5–0 
Mexico wins the Gold Cup for the fifth time. This is Mexico's first win in the US in 10 years, and their biggest win in 42 years.

Golf
Senior majors:
Senior British Open in Sunningdale, England:
(1) Loren Roberts  268 (−12) PO (2) Mark McNulty  & Fred Funk  268 (−12)
Roberts wins his second Senior British Open and fourth senior major in a playoff, eliminating Funk on the first extra hole and McNulty on the third.
PGA Tour:
RBC Canadian Open in Oakville, Ontario:
 Play suspended due to rain. The final round will resume Monday.
European Tour:
SAS Masters in Barsebäck, Sweden:
(1) Ricardo González  282 (−10) (2) Jamie Donaldson  284 (−8) (3) Jeppe Huldahl  286 (−6)
LPGA Tour:
Evian Masters in Évian-les-Bains, France:
(1) Ai Miyazato  274 (−14) PO
 Miyazato earns her first LPGA tour win with a birdie on the first hole of a playoff with Sophie Gustafson .

Motorcycle racing
Moto GP:
British motorcycle Grand Prix in North West Leicestershire, United Kingdom:
(1) Andrea Dovizioso  (Honda) 48:26.267 (2) Colin Edwards  (Yamaha) +1.360 (3) Randy de Puniet  (Honda) +1.600
Riders' standings (after 10 of 17 races): (1) Valentino Rossi  (Yamaha) 187 points (2) Jorge Lorenzo  (Yamaha) 162 (3) Casey Stoner  (Ducati) 150
Manufacturers' standings: (1) Yamaha 230 (2) Honda 164 (3) Ducati 156
Superbike World Championship:
Brno Superbike World Championship round in Brno, Czech Republic:
Race 1: (1) Max Biaggi  (Aprilia) 40:18.306 (2) Carlos Checa  (Honda) +3.631 (3) Jonathan Rea  (Honda) +9.948
Race 2: (1) Ben Spies  (Yamaha) 40:15.420 (2) Biaggi +0.213 (3) Michel Fabrizio  (Ducati) +0.657
Riders' standings (after 10 of 14 rounds): (1) Noriyuki Haga  (Ducati) 324 points (2) Spies 319 (3) Fabrizio 273

Swimming
World Aquatics Championships in Rome, Italy, day 1:
Men's 400m freestyle:  Paul Biedermann  3:40.07 (WR)  Oussama Mellouli  3:41.11 (AF)  Zhang Lin  3:41.35 (AS)
Women's 400m freestyle:  Federica Pellegrini  3:59.15 (WR)  Joanne Jackson  4:00.60  Rebecca Adlington  4:00.79
Women's 4 × 100 m freestyle relay:   (Inge Dekker, Ranomi Kromowidjojo, Femke Heemskerk, Marleen Veldhuis) 3:31.72 (WR)   (Britta Steffen 52.22 WR, Daniela Samulski, Petra Dallmann, Daniela Schreiber) 3:31.83   (Lisbeth Trickett, Marieke Guehrer, Shayne Reese, Felicity Galvez) 3:33.01
Men's 4 × 100 m freestyle relay:   (Michael Phelps, Ryan Lochte, Matt Grevers, Nathan Adrian) 3:09.21 (CR)   (Evgeniy Lagunov, Andrey Grechin, Danila Izotov, Alexander Sukhorukov) 3:09.52    (Fabien Gilot, Alain Bernard, Grégory Mallet, Frédérick Bousquet) 3:09.89
Women's 100m butterfly semifinals: (1) Sarah Sjöström  56.44 (WR)
Women's 200m individual medley semifinals: (1) Ariana Kukors  2:07.03 (WR)
Men's 50m butterfly semifinals: (1) Rafael Muñoz  22.68 (CR)
Men's 100m breaststroke semifinals: (1) Eric Shanteau  58.96 (CR)

Tennis
ATP World Tour:
Indianapolis Tennis Championships in Indianapolis, United States:
Final: Robby Ginepri  bt Sam Querrey  6–2, 6–4
Ginepri wins the tournament for the second time and his third career title.
German Open Hamburg in Hamburg, Germany:
Final: Nikolay Davydenko  bt Paul-Henri Mathieu  6–4, 6–2
Davydenko wins his first title this year and 15th of his career.
WTA Tour:
Banka Koper Slovenia Open in Portorož, Slovenia:
Final: Dinara Safina  bt Sara Errani  6–7(5), 6–1, 7–5
Safina wins her third title this year and 12th of her career.
Gastein Ladies in Bad Gastein, Austria:
Final: Andrea Petkovic  bt Ioana Raluca Olaru  6–2, 6–3
Petkovic wins her first WTA Tour title.

Volleyball
FIVB World League:
Final Round in Belgrade, Serbia:
Bronze medal match:   3–0 
Final:   3–2  
Brazil win the World League for the eighth time and equals Italy's record. All but one of those titles are in the last decade.

July 25, 2009 (Saturday)

Auto racing
Nationwide Series:
Kroger 200 in Clermont, Indiana:
(1) Carl Edwards  (Ford, Roush Fenway Racing) (2) Kyle Busch  (Toyota, Joe Gibbs Racing) (3) Matt Kenseth  (Ford, Roush Fenway Racing)

Cycling
Tour de France:
Stage 20 – Montélimar to Mont Ventoux (167 km): (1) Juan Manuel Gárate  4h 39' 21" (2) Tony Martin  + 3" (3) Andy Schleck  + 38" 4. Alberto Contador  s.t.
General classification: (1)  Contador 81h 46' 17" (2) Andy Schleck + 4' 11" (3) Lance Armstrong  (Astana) + 5' 24"
Points standing: (1)  Thor Hushovd  (Cervélo TestTeam) 260 points (2) Mark Cavendish  (Team Columbia–HTC) 235 (3) Gerald Ciolek  (Team Milram) 148
King of mountains standings: (1)  Franco Pellizotti  (Liquigas) 210 points (2) Egoi Martínez  135 (3) Contador 126
BMX World Championships in Adelaide, Australia:
Elite men:  Donny Robinson  28.648  Mike Day  29.544  Ramiro Marino  29.774
Elite women:  Sarah Walker  31.879  Eva Ailloud  32.991  Arielle Martin  33.894

Diving
World Aquatics Championships in Rome, Italy:
Men's 10 m synchro platform:  Huo Liang & Lin Yue  482.58 pts  David Boudia & Thomas Finchum  456.84  José Antonio Guerra Oliva & Jeinkler Aguirre  456.60

Football (soccer)
UEFA Women's Under-19 Championship in Belarus:
Final:  2–0 
England win their first ever title in women football.

Golf
Senior majors:
Senior British Open in Sunningdale, England, third round:
Leaderboard: (1) Greg Norman  200 (−10) (2) Fred Funk & Loren Roberts (both United States) 201 (−9)

Open water swimming
World Aquatics Championships in Rome, Italy:
Women's 25 km:  Angela Maurer  5:47:48.0  Anna Uvarova  5:47:51.9  Federica Vitale  5:47:52.7
Men's 25 km:  Valerio Cleri  5:26:31.6  Trent Grimsey  5:26:50.7  Vladimir Dyatchin  5:29:29.3

Rugby league
RLEF Euro Med Challenge:
 28–22

Rugby union
Tri Nations Series:
 28–19  in Bloemfontein
The Springboks open their Tri Nations campaign on a winning note, and also take first place in the IRB World Rankings from the All Blacks. Standings: South Africa 4 (1 match), New Zealand 4 (2 matches), Australia 1 (1 match)
Boks captain John Smit equals the record of Australia's George Gregan and England's Will Carling for most Tests as captain, with 59.

Synchronised swimming
World Aquatics Championships in Rome, Italy:
Team free:   99.167 pts   98.167   97.167
Russia win all 6 events they entered.

Volleyball
FIVB World League:
Final Round in Belgrade, Serbia:
Semifinals:
 3–0 
 3–1

July 24, 2009 (Friday)

Cricket
Pakistan in Sri Lanka:
3rd Test in Colombo, day 5:
 299 & 425/9d;  233 & 391/4 (134.0 ov, Kumar Sangakkara 130*). Match drawn. Sri Lanka win 3-match series 2–0.

Cycling
Tour de France:
Stage 19 – Bourgoin-Jallieu to Aubenas (195 km): (1) Mark Cavendish  (Team Columbia–HTC) 3h 50' 35" (2) Thor Hushovd  (Cervélo TestTeam) s.t. (3) Gerald Ciolek  (Team Milram) s.t.
Cavendish gets his fifth stage win in this Tour and his ninth win in two years makes him the British rider with most stage wins.
General classification: (1)  Alberto Contador  77h 06' 18" (2) Andy Schleck  + 4' 11" (3) Lance Armstrong  (Astana) + 5' 21"
Points standing: (1)  Hushovd 260 points (2) Cavendish 235 (3) Ciolek 148
King of mountains standings: (1)  Franco Pellizotti  (Liquigas) 196 points (2) Egoi Martínez  135 (3) Pierrick Fédrigo  99

Diving
World Aquatics Championships in Rome, Italy:
Women's 3 m synchro springboard:  Guo Jingjing/Wu Minxia  348.00  Tania Cagnotto/Francesca Dallapè  329.70  Yuliya Pakhalina/Anastasia Pozdniakova  310.80

Football (soccer)
UEFA Under-19 Championship in Ukraine:
Group A:
 1–2 
 2–2 
Standings (after 2 matches): Switzerland 4 points, England, Ukraine 2, Slovenia 1.
Group B:
 1–1 
 2–1 
Standings (after 2 matches): Serbia 4 points, Spain 3, France 2, Turkey 1.

Golf
Senior majors:
Senior British Open in Sunningdale, England, second round:
Leaderboard: (1) Fred Funk  129 (−11) (2) Sam Torrance  132 (−8) (3) Loren Roberts  134 (−6)

Rugby league
RLEF Euro Bowl:
 6–40

Synchronised swimming
World Aquatics Championships in Rome, Italy:
Duet free:  Natalia Ishchenko/Svetlana Romashina  98.833  Andrea Fuentes/Gemma Mengual  98.333  Jiang Tingting/Jiang Wenwen  97.000

Volleyball
FIVB World League:
Final Round in Belgrade, Serbia: (teams in bold advance to the semifinals)
Pool E:  1–3 
Standings: Serbia 6 points, Russia 3, USA 0.
Pool F:  3–0 
Standings: Brazil 6 points, Cuba 3, Argentina 0.

July 23, 2009 (Thursday)

Baseball
Major League Baseball:
Mark Buehrle of the Chicago White Sox throws the 18th perfect game in the history of Major League Baseball, and became the sixth pitcher in the history of the game to hurl both a no-hitter and a perfect game as the White Sox beat the Tampa Bay Rays, 5–0. The game was played in two hours and three minutes, the fastest perfect game since Tom Browning of the Cincinnati Reds beat the Los Angeles Dodgers on September 18, who took an hour and 51 minutes.

Cricket
Pakistan in Sri Lanka:
3rd Test in Colombo, day 4:
 299 & 425/9d (Shoaib Malik 134);  233 & 183/3 (59.0 ov). Sri Lanka require another 309 runs with 7 wickets remaining.

Cycling
Tour de France:
Stage 18 – Annecy (40 km ITT): (1) Alberto Contador  48' 30" (2) Fabian Cancellara  + 3" (3) Mikhail Ignatiev  + 15"
General classification: (1)  Contador 73h 15' 39" (2) Andy Schleck  (Team Saxo Bank) + 4' 11" (3) Lance Armstrong  (Astana) + 5' 25"
Points standing: (1)  Thor Hushovd  (Cervélo TestTeam) 230 points (2) Mark Cavendish  (Team Columbia–HTC) 200 (3) José Joaquín Rojas  126
King of mountains standings: (1)  Franco Pellizotti  (Liquigas) 196 points (2) Egoi Martínez  118 (3) Pierrick Fédrigo  99

Diving
World Aquatics Championships in Rome, Italy:
Men's 3 m springboard:  He Chong  505.20 points  Troy Dumais  498.40  Alexandre Despatie  490.30

Football (soccer)
CONCACAF Gold Cup in United States:
Semifinals in Chicago:
 0–2 
 1–1 , Mexico win 5–3 in penalty shootout
The USA and Mexico will renew their rivalry in a rematch of the 2007 Final.

Golf
Senior majors:
Senior British Open in Sunningdale, England, first round:
Leaderboard: (1) Fred Funk  64 (−6) (2) Jay Haas , Loren Roberts , Des Smyth  & Christopher Williams  66 (−4)

Synchronised swimming
World Aquatics Championships in Rome, Italy:
Solo free:  Natalia Ishchenko  98.833  Gemma Mengual  98.333  Beatrice Adelizzi  95.500

Volleyball
FIVB World League:
Final Round in Belgrade, Serbia:
Pool E:  0–3 
Russia and Serbia advance to the semifinals.
Pool F:  1–3

July 22, 2009 (Wednesday)

Cricket
Pakistan in Sri Lanka:
3rd Test in Colombo, day 3:
 299 & 300/5 (95.0 ov, Shoaib Malik 106*);  233. Pakistan led by 366 runs with 5 wickets remaining.

Cycling
Tour de France:
Stage 17 – Bourg-Saint-Maurice to Le Grand-Bornand (169 km): (1) Fränk Schleck  4h 53' 54" (2) Alberto Contador  same time (3) Andy Schleck  (Team Saxo Bank) s.t.
General classification: (1)  Contador 72h 27' 9" (2) Andy Schleck + 2' 26" (3) Fränk Schleck +3' 25" 4. Lance Armstrong  (Astana) +3' 55"
Points standing: (1)  Thor Hushovd  (Cervélo TestTeam) 230 points (2) Mark Cavendish  (Team Columbia–HTC) 200 (3) José Joaquín Rojas  126
King of mountains standings: (1)  Franco Pellizotti  (Liquigas) 196 points (2) Egoi Martínez  118 (3) Pierrick Fédrigo  97

Football (soccer)
UEFA Women's Under-19 Championship in Belarus:
Semifinals:
 2–5 (ET) 
Sofia Jakobsson scores a hat trick for Sweden.
 3–0

Open water swimming
World Aquatics Championships in Rome, Italy:
Women's 10 km:  Keri-anne Payne  2:01:37.1  Ekaterina Seliverstova  2:01:38.0  Martina Grimaldi  2:01:38.6
Men's 10 km:  Thomas Lurz  1:52:06.9  Andrew Gemmell  1:52:08.3  Fran Crippen  1:52:10.7

Synchronised swimming
World Aquatics Championships in Rome, Italy:
Free combination:   98.333   97.667   96.167

Volleyball
FIVB World League:
Final Round in Belgrade, Serbia:
Pool E:  3–0 
Pool F:  1–3

July 21, 2009 (Tuesday)

Cricket
Pakistan in Sri Lanka:
3rd Test in Colombo, day 2:
 299 & 16/1 (9.0 ov);  233. Pakistan led by 82 runs with 9 wickets remaining.

Cycling
Tour de France:
Stage 16 – Martigny to Bourg-Saint-Maurice (160 km): (1) Mikel Astarloza  4hr 14' 20" (2) Sandy Casar  +6" (3) Pierrick Fédrigo  +6"
General classification: (1)  Alberto Contador  (Astana) 63h 17′ 56″ (2) Lance Armstrong  (Astana) + 1' 37" (3) Bradley Wiggins  + 1' 46"
Points standing: (1)  Thor Hushovd  (Cervélo TestTeam) 218 points (2) Mark Cavendish  (Team Columbia–HTC) 200 (3) José Joaquín Rojas  126
King of mountains standings: (1)  Franco Pellizotti  (Liquigas) 159 points (2) Egoi Martínez  101 (3) Pierrick Fédrigo  97

Diving
World Aquatics Championships in Rome, Italy:
Women's 3 m springboard:  Guo Jingjing  388.20 pts,  Émilie Heymans  346.45,  Tania Cagnotto  341.25
Men's 10 m platform:  Tom Daley  539.85 pts,  Qiu Bo  532.20,  Luxin Zhou  530.55

Football (soccer)
UEFA Under-19 Championship in Ukraine:
Group A:
 1–1 
 0–0 
Group B:
 1–1 
 1–2

Korfball
World Games in Kaohsiung, Chinese Taipei:
7th–8th places:  18–31 
5th–6th places:  18–19 
3rd–4th places:  18–25  
Final:   20–25

Open water swimming
World Aquatics Championships in Rome, Italy:
Women's 5 km:  Melissa Gorman  56:55.8  Larisa Ilchenko  56:56.3  Poliana Okimoto  56:59.3
Men's 5 km:  Thomas Lurz  56:26.9  Spyridon Gianniotis  56:27.2  Chad Ho  56:41.9

Synchronised swimming
World Aquatics Championships in Rome, Italy:
Duet technical:  Anastasia Davydova/Svetlana Romashina  98.667  Andrea Fuentes/Gemma Mengual  97.333  Jiang Tingting/Jiang Wenwen  95.667

July 20, 2009 (Monday)

Cricket
Australia in England:
The Ashes Series:
2nd Test at Lord's, London, day 5:
 425 & 311/6d;  215 & 406 (107 ov, Michael Clarke 136, Andrew Flintoff 5/92). England win by 115 runs and lead the 5-match series 1–0.
England win an Ashes Test at Lord's for the first time in 75 years.
Bangladesh in West Indies:
2nd Test in St George's, Grenada, day 4:
 237 & 209;  232 & 217/6 (54.4 ov). Bangladesh win by 4 wickets and win the 2-match series 2–0.
Bangladesh win their first ever Test series overseas.
Pakistan in Sri Lanka:
3rd Test in Colombo, day 1:
 289/7 (86.0 ov)

Korfball
World Games in Kaohsiung – day 4:
5th–8th places:
  22–10 
  12–13 
1st–4th places:
  24–8 
  13–29

Synchronised swimming
World Aquatics Championships in Rome, Italy:
Solo technical:  Natalia Ishchenko  98.667  Gemma Mengual  97.833  Marie-Pier Boudreau Gagnon  96.000

July 19, 2009 (Sunday)

Cricket
Australia in England:
The Ashes Series:
2nd Test at Lord's, London, day 4:
 425 & 311/6d;  215 & 313/5 (86.0 ov, Michael Clarke 125*). Australia require another 209 runs with 5 wickets remaining.
Bangladesh in West Indies:
2nd Test in St George's, Grenada, day 3:
 237 & 192/8 (65.2 ov);  232. West Indies led by 197 runs with 2 wickets remaining.

Cycling
Tour de France:
Stage 15 – Pontarlier to Verbier (207 km): (1) Alberto Contador  (Astana) 5h 03' 58" (2) Andy Schleck  + 43" (3) Vincenzo Nibali  + 1' 03"
General classification: (1)  Alberto Contador  (Astana) 63h 17′ 56″ (2) Lance Armstrong  (Astana) + 1' 37" (3) Bradley Wiggins  + 1' 46"
Points standing: (1)  Thor Hushovd  (Cervélo TestTeam) 218 points (2) Mark Cavendish  (Team Columbia–HTC) 200 (3) José Joaquín Rojas  126
King of mountains standings: (1)  Franco Pellizotti  (Liquigas) 109 points (2) Egoi Martínez  101 (3) Pierrick Fédrigo  65

Diving
World Aquatics Championships in Rome, Italy:
Women's 1 m springboard:  Yuliya Pakhalina  325.05 points  Wu Minxia  311.90  Wang Han  303.95
Women's 10 m synchro platform:  Chen Ruolin/Wang Xin  369.18  Mary Beth Dunnichay/Haley Ishimatsu  324.66  Leong Mun Yee/Pandelela Rinong Pamg  321.66

Field hockey
Women's Champions Trophy in Sydney, Australia:
Final:   0–0  . Argentina win 4–3 by penalty strokes
Argentina win the Trophy for the second straight time, and third time overall.
3rd place playoff:   5–2 
5th place playoff:  7–0

Football (soccer)
CONCACAF Gold Cup in United States:
Quarterfinals in Arlington, Texas:
 1–5 
 4–0 
CAF Champions League group stage, matchday 1:
Group B:
TP Mazembe  2–0  Heartland
Monomotapa United  2–1  Étoile du Sahel
UEFA Women's Under-19 Championship in Belarus: (teams in bold advance to the semifinals)
Group A:
 9–0 
 0–2 
Standings: Switzerland, France, Germany 6 points, Belarus 0.
Group B:
 1–2 
 4–0 
Standings: England 7 points, Sweden 6, Norway 2, Iceland 1.

Golf
Men's majors:
The Open Championship in South Ayrshire, Scotland:
(1) Stewart Cink  & Tom Watson  278 (−2) (3) Chris Wood  & Lee Westwood  279 (−1)
Cink defeats Watson in a 4-hole playoff by 6 strokes and wins his first major, denying Watson from becoming the oldest major champion.
PGA Tour:
U.S. Bank Championship in Milwaukee in Brown Deer, Wisconsin:
 Winner: Bo Van Pelt  267 (−13) PO
 Van Pelt wins for the first time on the PGA Tour, defeating John Mallinger  on the second hole of a sudden-death playoff.

Korfball
World Games in Kaohsiung – day 3:
Pool A:
  37–10 
  15–19 
Pool B:
  26–18 
  17–14

Motorcycle racing
Moto GP:
German motorcycle Grand Prix in Hohenstein-Ernstthal, Germany:
(1) Valentino Rossi  (Yamaha) (2) Jorge Lorenzo  (Yamaha) (3) Dani Pedrosa  (Honda)
Riders' standings (after 9 of 17 races): (1) Rossi 176 points (2) Lorenzo 162 (3) Casey Stoner  (Ducati) 148
Manufacturers' standings: (1) Yamaha 220 points (2) Ducati 148 (3) Honda 126

Synchronised swimming
World Aquatics Championships in Rome, Italy:
Team technical:   98.833 points   97.833   96.667

Tennis
ATP World Tour:
Swedish Open in Båstad, Sweden:
Final: Robin Söderling  def. Juan Mónaco  6–3, 7–6(4)
Söderling wins his first ATP Tour title this year and fourth of his career.
MercedesCup in Stuttgart, Germany:
Final: Jérémy Chardy  def. Victor Hănescu  1–6, 6–3, 6–4
Chardy wins his first ATP Tour title.
WTA Tour:
Internazionali Femminili di Palermo in Palermo, Italy:
Final: Flavia Pennetta  def. Sara Errani  6–1, 6–2
Pennetta wins her first WTA Tour title this year, and the seventh of her career.
ECM Prague Open in Prague, Czech Republic:
Final: Sybille Bammer  def. Francesca Schiavone  7–6(4), 6–2
Bammer wins her first WTA Tour title this year, and the second of her career.

Volleyball
FIVB World League:
Pool D:
 3–0 
Final standings: Brazil 33 points, Finland 21, Poland 13, Venezuela 5.

July 18, 2009 (Saturday)

Auto racing
Nationwide Series:
Missouri-Illinois Dodge Dealers 250 in Madison, Illinois:
(1) Kyle Busch  (Toyota, Joe Gibbs Racing) (2) Reed Sorenson  (Toyota, Braun Racing) (3) Carl Edwards  (Ford, Roush Fenway Racing)

Cricket
Australia in England:
The Ashes Series:
2nd Test at Lord's, London, day 3:
 425 & 311/6 (71.2 ov);  215. England led by 521 runs with 4 wickets remaining.
Bangladesh in West Indies:
2nd Test in St George's, Grenada, day 2:
 237 & 56/1 (23.0 ov);  232. West Indies led by 61 runs with 9 wickets remaining.
ICC Intercontinental Cup in Rotterdam, Netherlands, day 4:
 177 & 419/9d;  229 & 233/8 (103.0 ov). Match drawn

Cycling
Tour de France:
Stage 14 – Colmar to Besançon (199 km): (1) Sergei Ivanov  4h 37' 46" (2) Nicolas Roche  + 16" (3) Hayden Roulston  + 16"
General classification: (1)  Rinaldo Nocentini  (Ag2r–La Mondiale) 58h 13′ 52″ (2) George Hincapie  (Team Columbia–HTC) + 5" (3) Alberto Contador  (Astana) + 6"
Points standing: (1)  Thor Hushovd  (Cervélo TestTeam) 218 points (2) Mark Cavendish  (Team Columbia–HTC) 200 (3) José Joaquín Rojas  125 (Cavendish finished 13th, but was relegated to 154th place by decision of the commissaires for blocking Hushovd in the run-in).
King of mountains standings: (1)  Franco Pellizotti  (Liquigas) 98 points (2) Egoi Martínez  95 (3) Brice Feillu  64
A spectator was killed, and two others injured, by a police motorcycle at Wittelsheim, about 40 km into the stage.

Diving
World Aquatics Championships in Rome, Italy:
Women's 10 m platform:  Paola Espinosa  428.25 points  Chen Ruolin  417.60  Kang Li  410.35
Men's 3 m synchro springboard:  Qin Kai/Wang Feng  467.94 points  Troy Dumais/Kristian Ipsen  445.59  Alexandre Despatie/Reuben Ross  428.64

Field hockey
Women's Champions Trophy in Sydney, Australia: (teams in bold advance to the final)
 4–1 
 2–1 
 0–0 
Final standings: Argentina 11 points, Australia 10, Netherlands 8, Germany 7, China 4, England 1.

Football (soccer)
CONCACAF Gold Cup in United States:
Quarterfinals in Philadelphia:
 0–1 
 2–1 (ET) 
CAF Champions League group stage, matchday 1:
Group A:
ZESCO United  1–1  Kano Pillars
Al-Merreikh  0–0  Al-Hilal

Golf
Men's majors:
The Open Championship in South Ayrshire, Scotland, third round:
Leaderboard: (1) Tom Watson  206 (−4) (2) Mathew Goggin  & Ross Fisher  207 (−3)
 The 59-year-old Watson will attempt to win his sixth Open and become the oldest player ever to win a regular major championship.

Korfball
World Games in Kaohsiung – day 2:
Pool A:
  18–12 
  10–34 
Pool B:
  11–15 
  16–30

Rugby league
RLEF European Shield:
 30–42 
Italy win the trophy for the second consecutive year.

Rugby union
Tri Nations Series:
 22–16  in Auckland
 Australia flanker George Smith becomes the 10th rugby union player with 100 international appearances.
2011 Rugby World Cup qualifying:
Oceania Qualification Playoff, second leg in Port Moresby:
 12–73 
Samoa win 188–19 on aggregate and qualify to the World Cup.

Volleyball
FIVB World League: (teams in bold advance to the final round)
Pool A:
 2–3 
 3–0 
Final Standings: USA 27 points, Italy 22, Netherlands 13, China 10.
Pool B:
 3–1 
Final Standings: Serbia 24 points, Argentina 21, France 18, Korea 9.
Pool C:
 0–3 
 3–1 
Final Standings: Cuba 26 points, Russia 23, Bulgaria 15, Japan 8.
Russia advance to the final round as the best runner-up.
Pool D:
 3–0 
Standings: Brazil 30 points (11 matches), Finland 21 (12), Poland 13 (12), Venezuela 5 (11).

July 17, 2009 (Friday)

Athletics
Golden League: (GL indicates Golden League event, athletes in bold are in contention for the 1M$ jackpot)
Meeting Areva in Saint-Denis, France:
Men:
100 Metres (GL):  Usain Bolt  9.79
400 Metres (GL):  Jeremy Wariner  45.28
800 Metres:  Ismail Ahmed Ismail  1:45.85
3000 Metres (GL):  Kenenisa Bekele  7:28.64
3000 Metres Steeplechase:  Mahiedine Mekhissi-Benabbad  8:13.23
110 Metres Hurdles (GL):  Dexter Faulk  13.14
Pole Vault:  Renaud Lavillenie  5.70
Triple Jump:  Phillips Idowu  17.17
Javelin Throw (GL):  Andreas Thorkildsen  88.03
Women:
100 Metres (GL):  Kerron Stewart  10.99
400 Metres (GL):  Sanya Richards  49.34
800 Metres:  Anna Willard  1:58.80
100 Metres Hurdles (GL):  Dawn Harper  12.68
400 Metres Hurdles:  Anna Jesień  54.37
High Jump (GL):  Blanka Vlašić  1.99
Pole Vault (GL):  Yelena Isinbayeva  4.65

Basketball
Philippine Basketball Association Fiesta Conference Finals at Quezon City:
Game 7: San Miguel Beermen 90, Barangay Ginebra Kings 79, San Miguel wins 4–3.
In the fourth Finals meeting between the two San Miguel Corporation teams, the Beermen clinch their 18th league championship and second Fiesta Conference championship, with second-year player Jonas Villanueva winning the Finals MVP honors.

Cricket
Australia in England:
The Ashes Series:
2nd Test at Lord's, London, day 2:
 425 (109.4 ov, Andrew Strauss 161);  156/8 (49 ov). Australia trail by 269 runs with 2 wickets remaining in the first innings.
Bangladesh in West Indies:
2nd Test in St George's, Grenada, day 1:
 237 (76.1 ov);  35/1 (10.0 ov). Bangladesh trail by 202 runs with 9 wickets remaining in the 1st innings.
ICC Intercontinental Cup in Rotterdam, Netherlands, day 3:
 177 & 419/9d (Sunil Dhaniram 144);  229 & 120/5 (44.0 ov). Netherlands require another 248 runs with 5 wickets remaining.

Cycling
Tour de France:
Stage 13 – Vittel to Colmar (200 km):  (1) Heinrich Haussler  (Cervélo TestTeam) 4h 56' 26" (2) Amets Txurruka  + 4' 11" (3) Brice Feillu  + 6' 13"
General classification: (1)  Rinaldo Nocentini  (Ag2r–La Mondiale) 53h 30′ 30″ (2) Alberto Contador  (Astana) + 6" (3) Lance Armstrong  (Astana) + 8"
Points standing: (1)  Thor Hushovd  (Cervélo TestTeam) 205 points (2) Mark Cavendish  (Team Columbia–HTC) 200 (3) José Joaquín Rojas  116
King of mountains standings: (1)  Franco Pellizotti  (Liquigas) 98 points (2) Egoi Martínez  95 (3) Feillu 64

Diving
World Aquatics Championships in Rome, Italy:
Men's 1 m springboard:  Qin Kai  449.00 points  Zhang Xinhua  445.90  Matthew Mitcham  440.20

Golf
Men's majors:
The Open Championship in South Ayrshire, Scotland, second round:
Leaderboard: (1) Steve Marino  & Tom Watson  135 (−5) (3) Mark Calcavecchia  136 (−4)
 Watson, two months shy of his 60th birthday, becomes the oldest player to lead at the end of any round in a major championship since such records were first officially kept after World War II.
Tiger Woods scores 5-over-par 145 and misses the cut by one stroke. This is only the second time he misses the cut in a major since he turned pro.

Korfball
World Games in Kaohsiung – day 1:
Pool A:
  21–16 
  35–8 
Pool B:
  25–13 
  26–19

Volleyball
FIVB World League: (teams in bold advance to the final round)
Pool A:
 0–3 
 3–0 
Standings: USA 24 points (11 matches), Italy 20 (11).
Team USA punches its ticket into the final stage. Italy secure second place.
Pool B:
 3–1 
 3–2 
Standings: Serbia 21 points (11 matches), Argentina 21 (12), France 18 (12).
Argentina claim a berth in the final stage, as Serbia are already in the final stage as host.
Pool C:
 0–3 
 3–0 
Standings: Cuba 23 points (11 matches), Russia 20 (11), Bulgaria 15 (11).
Cuba and Russia secure at least second place.

July 16, 2009 (Thursday)

Cricket
Australia in England:
The Ashes Series:
2nd Test at Lord's, London, day 1:
 364/6 (90.0 ov, Andrew Strauss 161*)
ICC Intercontinental Cup in Rotterdam, Netherlands, day 2:
 177 & 215/3 (50.0 ov);  229. Canada led by 163 runs with 7 wickets remaining.

Cycling
Tour de France:
Stage 12 – Tonnerre to Vittel (200 km): (1) Nicki Sørensen  (Team Saxo Bank) 4h 52' 24" (2) Laurent Lefèvre  (Bbox Bouygues Telecom) + 48" (3) Franco Pellizotti  (Liquigas) s.t.
General classification: (1)  Rinaldo Nocentini  (Ag2r–La Mondiale) 48h 27′ 21″ (2) Alberto Contador  (Astana) + 6" (3) Lance Armstrong  (Astana) + 8"
Points standing: (1)  Mark Cavendish   (Team Columbia–HTC) 200 points (2) Thor Hushovd  (Cervélo TestTeam) 190 (3) José Joaquín Rojas  116
King of mountains standings: (1)  Egoi Martínez  88 points (2) Pellizotti 71 (3) Christophe Kern  59

Field hockey
Women's Champions Trophy in Sydney, Australia:
 2–2 
 0–4 
Standings (after 4 matches): Argentina 10 points, Netherlands 8, Australia 7, Germany 6, China, England 1.

Football (soccer)
UEFA Women's Under-19 Championship in Belarus:
Group A:
 0–3 
 3–0 
Standing (after 2 matches): Switzerland 6 points, Germany, France 3, Belarus 0.
Group B:
 2–1 
 0–0 
Standings: England 4, Sweden 3, Norway 2, Iceland 1.

Golf
Men's majors:
The Open Championship in South Ayrshire, Scotland, first round:
(1) Miguel Ángel Jiménez  64 (−6) (2) Ben Curtis, Tom Watson (both United States) & Kenichi Kuboya  65 (−5)
Jiménez sinks a 45-foot (14 m) birdie putt on the 18th hole to deny the five-time Open champion Watson, two months shy of his 60th birthday, a share of the first-day lead.

Lacrosse
Major League Lacrosse All-Star Game in Denver, Colorado:
Old School 22, Young Guns 21 (OT)

Multi-sport event
The World Games open in Kaohsiung, Taiwan.

Volleyball
FIVB World League:
Pool B:
 3–1 
Standings: Argentina 19 points (11 matches), Serbia 18 (10), France 17 (11).
Pool D:
 3–2 
Standings: Brazil 27 points (10 matches), Finland 21 (12), Poland 13 (12).

July 15, 2009 (Wednesday)

Cricket
ICC Intercontinental Cup in Rotterdam, Netherlands, day 1:
 177;  74/3 (32.0 ov). Netherlands trail by 103 runs with 7 wickets remaining in the 1st innings.

Cycling
Tour de France:
Stage 11 – Vatan to Saint-Fargeau (192 km): (1) Mark Cavendish  (Team Columbia–HTC) 4h 17' 55" (2) Tyler Farrar  (Garmin–Slipstream) s.t. (3) Yauheni Hutarovich  (Française des Jeux) s.t.
Cavendish gets his fourth stage win in this Tour, equalling his achievement from last year, and matching Barry Hoban's record of eight stages won by a British cyclist (1967–75).
General classification: (1)  Rinaldo Nocentini  43h 28' 59" (2) Alberto Contador  +6" (3) Lance Armstrong  (Astana) +8"
Points standing: (1)  Cavendish 176 points (2) Thor Hushovd  (Cervélo TestTeam) 169 (3) José Joaquín Rojas  110
King of mountains standings: (1)  Egoi Martínez  79 points (2) Christophe Kern  59 (3) Franco Pellizotti  56

Field hockey
Women's Champions Trophy in Sydney, Australia:
 2–3 
 3–1 
Standings: Argentina 9 points (3 matches), Netherlands 7 (3), Germany 6 (4), Australia 4 (3), China 1 (4), England 1 (3).

Football (soccer)
Copa Libertadores Finals, second leg: (first leg result in parentheses)
Cruzeiro  1–2 (0–0)  Estudiantes
Estudiantes win the Cup for the fourth time, after break of 39 years.
Primera División Uruguaya Championship Playoff Final, second leg: (first leg result in parentheses)
Nacional 2–1 (2–1) Defensor Sporting
Nacional win the championship for the 42nd time.

Rugby league
State of Origin Series:
Game 3 in Brisbane: Queensland 16–28 New South Wales.
Queensland win the series 2–1.

Volleyball
FIVB World League:
Pool D:
 1–3 
Standings: Brazil 27 points (10 matches), Finland 20 (11).
Finland secured second place.

July 14, 2009 (Tuesday)

Baseball
MLB All-Star Game in St. Louis:
American League 4, National League 3:
The AL extends its unbeaten streak in All-Star games to 13. Carl Crawford, who makes a leaping catch at the wall to steal a home run from Brad Hawpe, is named Most Valuable Player.

Cricket
Pakistan in Sri Lanka:
2nd Test in Colombo, day 3:
 90 & 320 (Fawad Alam 168);  240 & 171/3 (31.5 ov). Sri Lanka win by 7 wickets, lead 3-match series 2–0.

Cycling
Tour de France:
Stage 10 – Limoges to Issoudun (193 km): (1) Mark Cavendish  (Team Columbia–HTC) 4h 46' 43" (2) Thor Hushovd  (Cervélo TestTeam) s.t. (3) Tyler Farrar  (Garmin–Slipstream) s.t.
Cavendish gets his third stage win in this Tour.
General classification: (1)  Rinaldo Nocentini  39h 11' 04" (2) Alberto Contador  +6" (3) Lance Armstrong  (Astana) +8"
Points standing: (1)  Hushovd 147 points (2) Cavendish 141 (3) José Joaquín Rojas  97
King of mountains standings: (1)  Egoi Martínez  78 points (2) Christophe Kern  59 (3) Franco Pellizotti  55

Field hockey
Women's Champions Trophy in Sydney, Australia:
 0–1 
 2–2 
Standings: Netherlands 7 points (3 matches), Argentina 6 (2), Australia 4 (3), Germany 3 (3), England 1 (2), China 1 (3).

July 13, 2009 (Monday)

Baseball
Major League Baseball:
All-Star Game:
MLB Home Run Derby in St. Louis:
Final: Prince Fielder (Milwaukee Brewers) def. Nelson Cruz (Texas Rangers) 23–21
News: The Washington Nationals, who hold the worst record in the major leagues (22–61), fire their manager Manny Acta, and appoint the team's bench coach Jim Riggleman as manager for the remainder of the season.

Cricket
Bangladesh in West Indies:
1st Test in Kingstown, St Vincent, day 5:
 238 & 345;  307 & 181 (70.1 ov). Bangladesh win by 95 runs, lead 2-match series 1–0.
Bangladesh win their second Test in history, and the first Test overseas.
Pakistan in Sri Lanka:
2nd Test in Colombo, day 2:
 90 & 178/1 (53.0 ov, Fawad Alam 102*);  240. Pakistan led by 28 runs with 9 wickets remaining.

Football (soccer)
UEFA Women's Under-19 Championship in Belarus:
Group A:
 1–2 
 1–4 
Group B:
 0–3 
 0–0

Golf
LPGA commissioner Carolyn Bivens resigns under pressure and is replaced by board member Marsha Evans effective immediately.

July 12, 2009 (Sunday)

Auto racing
Formula One:
German Grand Prix in Nürburg, Germany:
(1) Mark Webber  (Red Bull–Renault) 1:36:43.310 (2) Sebastian Vettel  (Red Bull-Renault) +9.252 (3) Felipe Massa  (Ferrari) +15.906
Drivers' standings (after 9 of 17 races): (1) Jenson Button  (Brawn–Mercedes) 68 points (2) Vettel 47 (3) Webber 45.5
Constructors' standings: (1) Brawn-Mercedes 112 (2) Red Bull-Renault 92.5 (3) Toyota 34.5
IndyCar Series:
Honda Indy Toronto in Toronto, Ontario:
(1) Dario Franchitti  (Chip Ganassi Racing) (2) Ryan Briscoe  (Team Penske) (3) Will Power  (Team Penske)
Drivers' standings (after 10 of 17 races): (1) Franchitti 347 points (2) Scott Dixon  (Chip Ganassi Racing) 345 (3) Briscoe 334
V8 Supercars:
Dunlop Townsville 400 in Townsville, Queensland:
Round 12: (1) James Courtney  (Ford Falcon) (2) Jamie Whincup  (Holden Commodore) (3) Garth Tander  (Holden Commodore)
Standings (after 12 of 26 races): (1) Whincup 1560 points (2) Will Davison  (Holden Commodore) 1386 (3) Tander 1212

Basketball
FIBA Under-19 World Championship in Auckland, New Zealand:
7th place:  82–74 
5th place:  70–92 
3rd place:   87–81 
Final:   88–80  
USA win the title for the fourth time.

Cricket
Australia in England:
The Ashes Series:
1st Test in Cardiff, day 5:
 435 & 252/9 (105.0 ov);  674/6d. Match drawn. 5-match series level 0–0.
Bangladesh in West Indies:
1st Test in Kingstown, St Vincent, day 4:
 238 & 321/5 (Tamim Iqbal 128);  307. Bangladesh led by 252 runs with 5 wickets remaining.
Pakistan in Sri Lanka:
2nd Test in Colombo, day 1:
 90;  164/3 (48.0 ov). Sri Lanka led by 74 runs with 7 wickets remaining in the 1st innings.
Kenya in Ireland:
3rd ODI in Dublin:
 256/7 (50 ov);  240/6 (46.0/46 ov). Ireland win by 4 runs (D/L method), win 3-match series 3–0.
Canada in Netherlands:
2nd ODI in Amstelveen:
Match abandoned without a ball bowled. Netherlands win 2-match series 1–0

Cycling
Tour de France:
Stage 9 – Saint-Gaudens to Tarbes (160 km): (1) Pierrick Fédrigo  4h 5' 31" (2) Franco Pellizotti  s.t. (3) Óscar Freire  +34"
General classification: (1)  Rinaldo Nocentini  34h 24' 21" (2) Alberto Contador  +6" (3) Lance Armstrong  (Astana) +8"
King of Mountain standings: (1)  Egoi Martínez  78 pts (2) Christophe Kern  59 (3) Pellizotti 55
Points standings: (1)  Thor Hushovd  117 pts (2) Mark Cavendish  106 (3) José Joaquín Rojas  75

Field hockey
Women's Champions Trophy in Sydney, Australia:
 1–3 
 0–1 
 0–1 
Standings (after 2 matches): Argentina 6 points, Netherlands 4, Australia, Germany 3, England 1, China 0.

Football (soccer)
CONCACAF Gold Cup in United States: (teams in bold advance to the quarterfinals)
Group C in Glendale, Arizona:
 4–0 
 2–0 
Standings: Mexico 7 points, Guadeloupe 6, Panama 4, Nicaragua 0.
Primera División Uruguaya Championship Playoff Final, first leg:
Defensor Sporting 1–2 Nacional

Golf
Women's majors:
U.S. Women's Open in Bethlehem, Pennsylvania:
(1) Ji Eun-hee  284 (E) (2) Candie Kung  285 (+1) (3) In-Kyung Kim  & Cristie Kerr  286 (+2)
Ji birdies the final hole to win her first major and second LPGA Tour title.
PGA Tour:
John Deere Classic in Silvis, Illinois:
(1) Steve Stricker  264 (−20) (2) Zach Johnson, Brett Quigley & Brandt Snedeker (all United States) 267 (−17)
Stricker wins his sixth PGA Tour title.
European Tour:
Barclays Scottish Open in Luss, Scotland:
(1) Martin Kaymer  269 (−15) (2) Gonzalo Fernández-Castaño  & Raphaël Jacquelin  271 (−13)
Kaymer wins two tournaments in successive weeks and his fourth career European Tour title.

Tennis
Davis Cup:
World Group Quarterfinals, day 3:
 3–2 
Juan Martín del Potro  bt Tomáš Berdych  6–4, 6–4, 6–4
Radek Štěpánek  bt Juan Mónaco  7–6(3), 6–3, 6–2
Czech Republic reach the semifinals for the first time since 1996.
 3–2 
Marin Čilić  bt James Blake  6–3, 6–3, 4–6, 6–2
Bob Bryan  bt Roko Karanušić  5–7, 6–3, 7–6(4)
Croatia reach the semifinals for the first time since they won the Cup in 2005.
 4–1 
Igor Andreev  bt Dudi Sela  4–3 (retired)
Harel Levy  bt Igor Kunitsyn  6–4 4–6 7–6(2)
 3–2 
Philipp Kohlschreiber  bt Fernando Verdasco  6–4 6–2 1–6 2–6 8–6
Juan Carlos Ferrero  bt Andreas Beck  6–4, 6–4, 6–4
Spain, the defending champion, will host Israel in the semifinals.
ATP World Tour:
Hall of Fame Tennis Championships in Newport, Rhode Island, United States:
Final: Rajeev Ram  (LL) bt Sam Querrey  (3) 6–7(3), 7–5, 6–3
Ram wins his first ATP World Tour title.
WTA Tour:
GDF Suez Grand Prix in Budapest, Hungary:
Final: Ágnes Szávay  (4) bt Patty Schnyder  (1) 2–6, 6–4, 6–2
Szávay wins her third career WTA Tour title and becomes the first Hungarian winner of the singles title in this tournament.

Volleyball
FIVB World League: (teams in bold advance to the final stage)
Pool A:
  3–0  
Standings (after 10 from 12 matches): USA 21 pts, Italy 17, Netherlands 13, China 9.
Pool B:
  1–3  
Standings: Serbia 18 pts, France 17, Argentina 16, South Korea 9.
Pool C:
  3–0  
Standings: Cuba 20 pts, Russia 17, Bulgaria 15, Japan 8.
Pool D:
  0–3  
Standings: Brazil 27 pts, Finland 17, Poland 11, Venezuela 5.

July 11, 2009 (Saturday)

Auto racing
Sprint Cup Series:
LifeLock.com 400 in Joliet, Illinois:
 (1) Mark Martin  (Chevrolet, Hendrick Motorsports) (2) Jeff Gordon  (Chevrolet, Hendrick Motorsports) (3) Kasey Kahne  (Dodge, Richard Petty Motorsports)
Drivers' standings (after 19 of 26 races leading to the Chase for the Sprint Cup): (1) Tony Stewart  2884 points (Chevrolet, Stewart Haas Racing) (2) Gordon 2709 (3) Jimmie Johnson  2672 (Chevrolet, Hendrick Motorsports)
V8 Supercars:
Dunlop Townsville 400 in Townsville, Queensland:
Round 11: (1) Jamie Whincup  (Ford Falcon) (2) Will Davison  (Holden Commodore) (3) Garth Tander  (Holden Commodore)
Standings (after 11 of 26 races): (1) Whincup 1422 points (2) Will Davison 1266 (3) Tander 1083

Basketball
Summer Universiade in Belgrade, Serbia:
Men:
Final:   73–51  
Bronze medal match:   91–80 
Women:
Final:   83–64  
Bronze medal match:   88–77

Cricket
Australia in England:
The Ashes Series:
1st Test in Cardiff, day 4:
 435 & 20/2 (7.0 ov);  674/6d (Marcus North 125*, Brad Haddin 121). England trail by 219 runs with 8 wickets remaining.
Four Australian players score hundreds in one innings for the first time in the Ashes history.
Bangladesh in West Indies:
1st Test in Kingstown, St Vincent, day 3:
 238 & 26/0 (7.0 ov);  307. Bangladesh trail by 43 runs with 10 wickets remaining.
Kenya in Ireland:
2nd ODI in Dublin:
 175 (45.1 ov);  104/1 (21/21 ov). Ireland win by 52 runs (D/L method), lead 3-match series 2–0.
Canada in Netherlands:
1st ODI in Amstelveen:
 237/7 (50 ov);  187 (39 ov). Netherlands win by 50 runs, lead 2-match series 1–0.

Cycling
Tour de France:
Stage 8 – Andorra la Vella to Saint-Girons (176 km): (1) Luis León Sánchez  4h 31' 50" (2) Sandy Casar  s.t. (3) Mikel Astarloza  s.t.
General classification: (1)  Rinaldo Nocentini  30h 18' 16" (2) Alberto Contador  +6" (3) Lance Armstrong  (Astana) +8"
King of Mountain standings: (1)  Christophe Kern  59 pts (2) Egoi Martínez  (Euskaltel-Euskadi) 54 (3) Brice Feillu  49
Points standings: (1)  Thor Hushovd  117 pts (2) Mark Cavendish  106 (3) Gerald Ciolek  66

Field hockey
Women's Champions Trophy in Sydney, Australia:
 2–2 
 0–2 
 2–1

Football (soccer)
CONCACAF Gold Cup in United States: (teams in bold advance to the quarterfinals)
Group B in Foxborough, Massachusetts:
 2–2 
 4–0 
Standings: USA 7 points, Honduras 6, Haiti 4, Grenada 0.

Golf
Women's majors:
U.S. Women's Open in Bethlehem, Pennsylvania, third round:
Leaderboard: (1) Cristie Kerr  211(−2) (2) Eun-Hee Ji  213(E) (3) Jean Reynolds  & Teresa Lu  215(+2)

Mixed martial arts
UFC 100 in Las Vegas:
 UFC Welterweight Championship bout: Georges St-Pierre  retains his title by unanimous decision over Thiago Alves .
 UFC Heavyweight Championship unification bout: World Heavyweight Champion Brock Lesnar  defeats Interim Heavyweight Champion Frank Mir  by TKO in the second round.

Rugby league
RLEF European Shield:
 38–8

Rugby union
2011 Rugby World Cup qualifying
Americas qualification playoff, second leg in Edmonton: (first leg result in parentheses)
 41–18 (6–12) 
Canada win 47–30 on aggregate, and qualify for the World Cup. USA will play against  for another World Cup berth.
Oceania Qualification Playoff, first leg in Apia:
 115–7

Tennis
Davis Cup:
World Group Quarterfinals, day 2:
 2–1 
Radek Štěpánek/Tomáš Berdych  bt Leonardo Mayer/José Acasuso  6–1, 6–4, 6–3
 2–1 
Bob Bryan/Mike Bryan  bt Lovro Zovko/Roko Karanušić  6–3, 6–1, 6–3
 3–0 
Jonathan Erlich/Andy Ram  bt Igor Kunitsyn/Marat Safin  6–3, 6–4, 6–7(3), 4–6, 6–4
Israel advance to the semifinal for the first time.
 2–1 
Feliciano López/Fernando Verdasco  bt Nicolas Kiefer/Mischa Zverev  6–3, 7–6(1), 6–7(6), 6–3
WTA Tour:
Swedish Open in Båstad, Sweden:
Final: María José Martínez Sánchez  bt Caroline Wozniacki  7–5, 6–4
Martínez Sánchez wins her second career title.

Volleyball
FIVB World League: teams in bold advance to the final stage.
Pool A:
  2–3  
  3–1  
Standings: USA 21 pts, Italy 17.
Pool B:
  0–3  
  2–3  
Standings: Serbia 18 pts, Argentina 16.
Pool C:
  3–2  
  1–3  
Standings: Cuba 20 pts (9 matches), Russia 17 (10).
Pool D:
  3–0  
Standings: Brazil 24 pts (9 matches), Finland 17 (10).
Summer Universiade in Belgrade, Serbia:
Men:
Final:   3–0  
Bronze medal match:   3–0

July 10, 2009 (Friday)

Athletics
Golden League:
Golden Gala in Rome, Italy: (GL indicates Golden League event, athletes in bold are in contention for the 1M$ jackpot)
Men:
100 Metres (GL):  Tyson Gay  9.77sec
400 Metres (GL):  Chris Brown  44.81
800 Metres:  Alfred Kirwa Yego  1:45.23
1500 Metres:  Asbel Kipruto Kiprop  3:31.20
5000 Metres (GL):  Kenenisa Bekele  12:56.23
110 Metres Hurdles (GL):  Dayron Robles  13.17
400 Metres Hurdles:  Kerron Clement  48.09
Long Jump:  Dwight Phillips  8.61m
Javelin Throw (GL):  Andreas Thorkildsen  87.46
Women:
100 Metres (GL):  Kerron Stewart  10.75sec
400 Metres (GL):  Sanya Richards  49.46
800 Metres:  Maggie Vessey  2:00.13
1500 Metres:  Maryam Yusuf Jamal  3:56.55
3000 Metres Steeplechase:  Gulnara Galkina  9:11.58
100 Metres Hurdles (GL):  Dawn Harper  12.55
400 Metres Hurdles:  Anna Jesień  54.31
High Jump (GL):  Antonietta Di Martino  2.00m
Pole Vault (GL):  Yelena Isinbayeva  4.85

Auto racing
Nationwide Series:
Dollar General 300 in Joliet, Illinois:
(1) Joey Logano  (Toyota, Joe Gibbs Racing) (2) Kyle Busch  (Toyota, Joe Gibbs Racing) (3) Brian Vickers  (Toyota, Red Bull Racing Team)

Baseball
Major League Baseball:
Jonathan Sánchez of the San Francisco Giants twirls the first no hitter of the season in defeating the San Diego Padres, 8–0 facing 28 batters, one over the minimum thanks to an eighth-inning error by Juan Uribe.

Cricket
Australia in England:
The Ashes Series:
1st Test in Cardiff, day 3:
 435;  479/5 (Simon Katich 122, Ricky Ponting 150). Australia led by 44 runs with 5 wickets remaining in the 1st innings.
Bangladesh in West Indies:
1st Test in Kingstown, St Vincent, day 2:
 238;  17/1 (7.0 ov). West Indies trail by 221 runs with 9 wickets remaining in the 1st innings.

Cycling
Tour de France:
Stage 7 – Barcelona to Andorra-Arcalis (224 km): (1) Brice Feillu  6h 11' 31" (2) Christophe Kern  + 5" (3) Johannes Fröhlinger  + 25"
General classification: (1)  Rinaldo Nocentini  (Ag2r–La Mondiale) 25h 44' 32" (2) Alberto Contador  (Astana) + 6" (3) Lance Armstrong  (Astana) + 8"
King of Mountain standings: (1)  Feillu 49 points (2) Christophe Riblon  (Ag2r–La Mondiale) 46 (3) Kern 46
Points standings: (1)  Mark Cavendish  (Team Columbia–HTC) 106 points (2) Thor Hushovd  (Cervélo TestTeam) 105 (3) Gerald Ciolek  (Team Milram) 66

Football (soccer)
CONCACAF Gold Cup in United States: (teams in bold advance to the quarterfinals)
Group A in Miami:
 2–2 
 0–1 
Standings: Canada 7 points, Costa Rica 4, Jamaica, El Salvador 3.
 also advance to the quarterfinals.
Summer Universiade in Belgrade, Serbia:
Men:
Final:   3–2  
Bronze medal match:   1–0 
Women:
Final:   4–1  
Bronze medal match:   4–1

Golf
Women's majors:
U.S. Women's Open in Bethlehem, Pennsylvania, second round:
Leaderboard: (1) Cristie Kerr  139 (−3) (2) Paula Creamer  140 (−2) (3) Jean Reynolds  141 (−1)

Tennis
Davis Cup:
World Group Quarterfinals, day 1:
 1–1 
Tomáš Berdych  bt Juan Mónaco  6–4, 2–6, 2–6, 6–3, 6–2
Juan Martín del Potro  bt Ivo Minář  6–1, 6–3, 6–3
 2–0 
Ivo Karlović  bt James Blake  6–7(5), 4–6, 6–3, 7–6(3), 7–5
Marin Čilić  bt Mardy Fish  4–6, 6–3, 6–7(2), 6–1, 8–6
 2–0 
Harel Levy  bt Igor Andreev  6–4, 6–2, 4–6, 6–2
Dudi Sela  bt Mikhail Youzhny  3–6, 6–1, 6–0, 7–5
 1–1 
Fernando Verdasco  bt Andreas Beck  6–0, 3–6, 6–7(4), 6–2, 6–1
Philipp Kohlschreiber  bt Tommy Robredo  6–3, 6–4, 6–4

Volleyball
FIVB World League:
Pool A:
  1–3  
Standings: USA 18 points, Italy 17.
Pool B:
  3–1  
Standings: Serbia 16 points, Argentina 15.
Pool C:
  3–0  
Standings: Cuba 19 points (8 matches), Russia 17 (9).
Pool D:
  3–1  
  0–3  
Standings: Brazil 24 points, Finland 14.
Brazil qualify for the final stage.
Summer Universiade in Belgrade, Serbia:
Women:
Final:   3–2  
Bronze medal match:   3–1

July 9, 2009 (Thursday)

Cricket
Australia in England:
The Ashes Series:
1st Test in Cardiff, day 2:
 435;  249/1 (Simon Katich 104*, Ricky Ponting 100*). Australia trail by 186 runs with 9 wickets remaining in the 1st innings.
Bangladesh in West Indies:
1st Test in Kingstown, St Vincent, day 1:
 42/0 (18.5 ov) vs 
Kenya in Ireland:
1st ODI in Dublin:
 214/9 (50 ov);  215/7 (48.5 ov). Ireland win by 3 wickets, lead 3-match series 1–0.

Cycling
Tour de France:
Stage 6 – Girona to Barcelona (175 km): (1) Thor Hushovd  (Cervélo TestTeam) 4h 21' 33" (2) Óscar Freire  (Rabobank) s.t. (3) José Joaquín Rojas  s.t.
General classification: (1)  Fabian Cancellara  (Team Saxo Bank) 19h 29' 22" (2) Lance Armstrong  (Astana) + 0" (3) Alberto Contador  (Astana) + 19"
Points standings: (1)  Mark Cavendish  (Team Columbia–HTC) 106 points (2) Hushovd 105 (3) Gerald Ciolek  (Team Milram) 66

Football (soccer)
CONCACAF Gold Cup in United States: (teams in bold advance to the quarterfinals)
Group C in Houston:
 2–0 
 1–1 
Standings: Guadeloupe 6 points, Mexico 4, Panama 1, Nicaragua 0.
 and  also clinch quarterfinal berths.
Recopa Sudamericana, second leg: (first leg result in parentheses)
LDU Quito  3–0 (1–0)  Internacional
LDU Quito win 4–0 on aggregate.

Golf
Women's majors:
U.S. Women's Open in Bethlehem, Pennsylvania, first round:
Leaderboard: (1) Na Yeon Choi  68 (−3) (2) Cristie Kerr , Lorena Ochoa  & Jean Reynolds  69 (−2)

July 8, 2009 (Wednesday)

Cricket
Australia in England:
The Ashes Series:
1st Test in Cardiff, day 1:
 336/7 (90 overs) vs 
Canada in Scotland:
2nd ODI in Aberdeen:
 250/9 (50 ov);  253/5 (47.2 ov). Scotland win by 5 wickets. 2-match series drawn 1–1.

Cycling
Tour de France:
Stage 5 – Le Cap d'Agde to Perpignan (197 km): (1) Thomas Voeckler  (Bbox Bouygues Telecom) 4h 29' 35" (2) Mikhail Ignatiev  (Team Katusha) + 7" (3) Mark Cavendish  (Team Columbia–HTC) + 7"
General classification: (1)  Fabian Cancellara  15h 07' 49" (2) Lance Armstrong  same time (3) Alberto Contador  (Astana) +19"
Points standing: (1)  Cavendish 96 pts (2) Thor Hushovd  70 (3) Tyler Farrar  54

Football (soccer)
CONCACAF Gold Cup in United States:
Group B in Washington, D.C.:
 2–0 
 0–2 
Standings: USA 6 points, Haiti, Honduras 3, Grenada 0.
Copa Libertadores Finals, first leg:
Estudiantes  0–0  Cruzeiro
UEFA Champions League 2009–10, First qualifying round, second leg: (first leg result in parentheses)
Mogren  4–0 (2–0)  Hibernians
Mogren win 6–0 on aggregate and will play against F.C. Copenhagen in the second round.
Primera División Uruguaya Championship Playoff, semifinal third leg:
Defensor Sporting 0–3 Nacional

July 7, 2009 (Tuesday)

Cricket
Pakistan in Sri Lanka:
1st Test in Galle, day 4:
 292 & 217;  342 & 117 (44.3 ov). Sri Lanka win by 50 runs, lead 3-match series 1–0.
Canada in Scotland:
1st ODI in Aberdeen:
 286/4 (50 ov);  287/4 (48.4 ov). Canada win by 6 wickets, lead 2-match series 1–0.

Cycling
Tour de France:
Stage 4 – Montpellier (38 km TTT): (1) Astana 46' 29" (2) Garmin–Slipstream + 18" (3) Team Saxo Bank + 40"
General classification: (1)  Fabian Cancellara  (Team Saxo Bank) 10h 38' 07" (2) Lance Armstrong  (Astana) s.t. (3) Alberto Contador  (Astana) + 19"

Football (soccer)
CONCACAF Gold Cup in United States:
Group A in Columbus, Ohio:
 0–1 
 1–0 
Standings: Canada 6 points, El Salvador, Costa Rica 3, Jamaica 0.
UEFA Champions League 2009–10, First qualifying round, second leg: (first leg result in parentheses)
Sant Julià  1–1 (1–1)  Tre Fiori.
Sant Julià win 5–4 in penalty shootout, and will play against Levski Sofia in the second round.
Chilean League, Apertura playoff final, second leg: (first leg result in parentheses)
Unión Española 0–1 (1–1) Universidad de Chile. Universidad win 2–1 on aggregate.
Universidad win the championship for the 13th time, and the first since 2004.

July 6, 2009 (Monday)

Cricket
Pakistan in Sri Lanka:
1st Test in Galle, day 3:
 292 & 217;  342 & 71/2 (19.0 ov). Pakistan require another 97 runs with 8 wickets remaining.
ICC Intercontinental Cup:
 v  at Eglinton:
Ireland 404 and 224/7d; Kenya 331 and 245/8. Match drawn

Cycling
Tour de France:
Stage 3 – Marseille to La Grande-Motte (196 km): (1) Mark Cavendish  (Team Columbia–HTC) 5h 01' 24" (2) Thor Hushovd  (Cervélo TestTeam) s.t. (3) Cyril Lemoine  (Skil–Shimano) s.t.
General classification: (1)  Fabian Cancellara  9h 50' 58" (2) Tony Martin  (Team Columbia–HTC) +33" (3) Lance Armstrong  +40"
Points standing: (1)  (1) Cavendish 70 pts (2) Hushovd 54 (3) Samuel Dumoulin  36

July 5, 2009 (Sunday)

Auto racing
IndyCar Series:
Camping World Watkins Glen Grand Prix in Watkins Glen, New York
(1) Justin Wilson  (Dale Coyne Racing) (2) Ryan Briscoe  (Team Penske) (3) Scott Dixon  (Chip Ganassi Racing)
Drivers' standings (after 9 of 17 races): (1) Dixon 313 points (2) Dario Franchitti  (Chip Ganassi Racing) 294 (3) Briscoe 294 (Franchitti second via tiebreaker)
World Touring Car Championship:
Race of Portugal in Porto, Portugal:
Race 1: (1) Gabriele Tarquini  (SEAT León 2.0 TDI) (2) Robert Huff  (Chevrolet Cruze) (3) Yvan Muller  (SEAT León 2.0 TDI)
Race 2: (1) Augusto Farfus  (BMW 320si) (2) Yvan Muller (3) Rickard Rydell  (SEAT León 2.0 TDI)
Standings (after 14 of 24 races): (1) Yvan Muller 80 points (2) Tarquini 66 (3) Farfus 65

Cricket
Pakistan in Sri Lanka:
1st Test in Galle, day 2:
 292 & 0/0 (1 over);  342 (94 overs, Mohammad Yousuf 112)
India in West Indies:
4th ODI in Gros Islet, St Lucia:
 27/1 (7.3/49 ov) vs . No result. India win 4-match series 2–1.

Cycling
Tour de France:
Stage 2 – Monaco to Brignoles (182 km): (1) Mark Cavendish  (Team Columbia–HTC) 4h 30' 02" (2) Tyler Farrar  (Garmin–Slipstream) same time (3) Romain Feillu  (Agritubel) s.t.
General classification: (1)  Fabian Cancellara  (Team Saxo Bank) 4h 49' 34" (2) Alberto Contador  (Astana) + 18" (3) Bradley Wiggins  (Garmin–Slipstream) + 19" ...10 Lance Armstrong  (Astana) + 40"
Points standing: (1)  Cavendish 35 points (2) Farrar 30 (3) Feillu 26
2009 European Road Championships:
Men's road race U23  Kris Boeckmans ,  Jarosław Marycz ,  Sacha Modolo

Football (soccer)
2010 FIFA World Cup Qualifying:
2010 FIFA World Cup qualification (CAF) Third Round, matchday 3:
Group C:
 3–0 
Standings: Algeria 7 points, Egypt, Zambia 4, Rwanda 1.
CONCACAF Gold Cup in United States:
Group C in Oakland, California:
 1–2 
 2–0 
Argentine Primera División – Clausura, final matchday:
(2) Vélez Sársfield 1–0 (1) Huracán
Final standings: Vélez Sársfield 40 points, Huracán, Lanús 38 points.
A goal by Maximiliano Moralez in the 84th minute gives Vélez Sársfield their seventh championship, and denies Huracán a first title in 36 years.
Primera División de Paraguay – Apertura, final matchday:
Standings: Cerro Porteño 46 points, Libertad 42.
Cerro Porteño win the championship for the 28th time.

Golf
PGA Tour:
AT&T National in Bethesda, Maryland
Winner: Tiger Woods  267 (−13)
 In the tournament he hosts, Woods holds off Hunter Mahan  by one shot.
European Tour:
Open de France in Paris, France
Winner: Martin Kaymer  271 (−13) PO
 Kaymer defeats Lee Westwood  on the first playoff hole.
LPGA Tour:
Jamie Farr Owens Corning Classic in Sylvania, Ohio
Winner: Eunjung Yi  266 (−18) PO
 Yi defeats Morgan Pressel  on the first playoff hole.

Motorcycle racing
Moto GP:
United States motorcycle Grand Prix in Laguna Seca, California, United States:
(1) Dani Pedrosa  (Honda) 44:01.580 (2) Valentino Rossi  (Yamaha) +0.344 (3) Jorge Lorenzo  (Yamaha) +1.926
Riders' standings (after 8 of 17 races): (1) Rossi 151 points (2) Lorenzo 142 (3) Casey Stoner  (Ducati) 135
Manufacturers' standings: (1) Yamaha 195 (2) Ducati 135 (3) Honda 110

Tennis
Wimbledon Championships in London, day 13: (seeding in parentheses)
Gentlemen's singles Final:
Roger Federer  [2] def. Andy Roddick  [6] 5–7 7–6(6) 7–6(5) 3–6 16–14
Federer wins his sixth Wimbledon title and a record 15th Grand Slam tournament.
Mixed doubles Final:
Mark Knowles /Anna-Lena Grönefeld  [9] def. Leander Paes /Cara Black  [1] 7–5 6–3
Boys' singles Final:
Andrey Kuznetsov  def. Jordan Cox  4–6 6–2 6–2
Girls' doubles Final:
Noppawan Lertcheewakarn /Sally Peers  def. Kristina Mladenovic /Silvia Njirić  [2] 6–1 6–1
Boys' doubles Final:
Pierre-Hugues Herbert /Kevin Krawietz  def. Julien Obry /Adrien Puget  6–7(3) 6–2 12–10

Triathlon
European Championships in Holten, Netherlands:
Men:  Javier Gomez  1:44:14  Alistair Brownlee  1:44:41  Alexander Brukhankov  1:44:49
Women:  Nicola Spirig  1:55:42  Elizabeth May  1:56:11  Vanessa Fernandes  1:56:32

Volleyball
FIVB World League:
Pool A:
 3–0 
 1–3 
USA lead the group with 18 points, followed by Italy with 14.
Pool B:
 1–3 
 3–0 
Serbia lead the group with 16 points, ahead of Argentina with 12.
Pool C:
 3–2 
 0–3 
Cuba lead the group with 19 points, ahead of Russia with 14.

July 4, 2009 (Saturday)

American football
Former Houston Oilers and Tennessee Titans quarterback Steve McNair is found as one of two victims of a shooting murder in Nashville, Tennessee.

Auto racing
Sprint Cup Series:
Coke Zero 400 in Daytona Beach, Florida:
 (1)  Tony Stewart (Chevrolet, Stewart Haas Racing) (2)  Jimmie Johnson (Chevrolet, Hendrick Motorsports) (3)  Denny Hamlin (Toyota, Joe Gibbs Racing)
Drivers' standings (after 18 of 26 races leading to the Chase for the Sprint Cup): (1) Stewart 2719 points (2)  Jeff Gordon (Chevrolet, Hendrick Motorsports) 2539 (3) Johnson 2525

Basketball
Mediterranean Games in Pescara, Italy:
Men's final:   72–60  
Men's bronze medal game:   88–71

Cricket
Pakistan in Sri Lanka:
1st Test in Galle, day 1:
 292 (80.2 overs);  15/2
ICC Intercontinental Cup:
 v  at Aberdeen:
Scotland 185 and 199; Canada 142 and 213. Scotland win by 29 runs

Cycling
Tour de France:
Stage 1 – Monaco (15 km ITT): (1)  Fabian Cancellara  (Team Saxo Bank) 19' 33" (2) Alberto Contador  (Astana) + 18" (3) Bradley Wiggins  (Garmin–Slipstream) + 19" ...10 Lance Armstrong  (Astana) + 40"
2009 European Road Championships:
Women's road race U23  Chantal Blaak ,  Katie Colclough ,  Marianne Vos

Football (soccer)
CONCACAF Gold Cup in United States:
Group B in Seattle:
 1–0 
 0–4 
Chilean League, Apertura playoff final, first leg:
Universidad de Chile 1–1 Unión Española
Mediterranean Games in Pescara, Italy:
Final:   2–1  
Bronze medal match:   0–0 . Libya win 8–7 in penalty shootout

Rugby league
RLEF European Shield:
 30–4 
RLEF Euro Med Challenge:
 6–29

Rugby union
Lions tour of South Africa:
 9–28 British & Irish Lions in Johannesburg
South Africa win the Test series 2–1. The Lions win denies the Springboks a first series sweep in 118 years.
2011 Rugby World Cup qualifying:
Americas qualification playoff, first leg in Charleston, South Carolina:
 12–6 
Oceania qualification, Nations Cup Final in Port Moresby, Papua New Guinea:
 29–21 
PNG advance to the Oceania Qualification Playoff against .

Tennis
Wimbledon Championships in London, day 12: (seeding in parentheses)
Ladies' singles Final:
Serena Williams  [2] def. Venus Williams  [3] 7–6(3), 6–2
Serena wins the title for the 3rd time and her 11th Grand Slam tournament.
Gentlemen's doubles Final:
Daniel Nestor /Nenad Zimonjić  [2] def. Bob Bryan /Mike Bryan  [1] 7–6(7), 6–7(3), 7–6(3), 6–3
Nestor and Zimonjic win their second sraight title. Nestor wins his fifth career Grand Slam title.
Ladies' doubles Final:
Serena Williams /Venus Williams  [4] def. Samantha Stosur /Rennae Stubbs  [3] 7–6(4), 6–4
The Williams sisters win their second straight doubles title, their fourth career Wimbledon doubles title and their ninth Grand Slam doubles title. Serena wins her second title of the day.
Girls' singles Final:
Noppawan Lertcheewakarn  (4) def. Kristina Mladenovic  (1) 3–6, 6–3, 6–1

Volleyball
FIVB World League:
Pool A:
 3–2 
USA lead the group with 15 points, followed by Italy and Netherlands with 11.
Pool B:
 2–3 
Pool C:
 1–3 
 3–2 
Cuba lead the group with 16 points, ahead of Russia with 14.
Pool D:
 3–2 
Finland rally from 2 sets down to hand Brazil their first loss, and keep alive their slim hopes to qualify for the final stage.
 3–1 
Brazil lead the group with 21 points, ahead of Poland and Finland with 11.

July 3, 2009 (Friday)

Athletics
Golden League:
Bislett Games in Oslo, Norway: (GL indicates Golden League event, athletes in bold are in contention for the 1M$ jackpot)
Men:
100 Metres (GL):  Asafa Powell  10.07sec
400 Metres (GL):  Renny Quow  45.18
800 Metres:  Yuriy Borzakovskiy  1:44.42
1500 Metres:  Collins Cheboi  3:36.24
One Mile:  Deresse Mekonnen  3:48.95
3000 Metres (GL):  Richard Bartale  7:50.58
5000 Metres (GL):  Kenenisa Bekele  13:04.87
110 Metres Hurdles (GL):  Antwon Hicks  13.41
Javelin Throw (GL):  Tero Pitkämäki  84.63 m
Women:
100 Metres (GL):  Kerron Stewart  10.99
400 Metres (GL):  Sanya Richards  49.23
800 Metres:  Claire Gibson  2:01.42
5000 Metres:  Meseret Defar  14:36.38
3000 Metres Steeplechase:  Ruth Bisibori Nyangau  9:18.65
100 Metres Hurdles (GL):  Damu Cherry  12.68
High Jump (GL):  Blanka Vlašić  2.00 m
Pole Vault (GL):  Yelena Isinbayeva  4.71 m

Auto racing
Nationwide Series:
Subway Jalapeño 250 in Daytona Beach, Florida
 (1)  Clint Bowyer (Chevrolet, Richard Childress Racing) (2)  Kyle Busch (Toyota, Joe Gibbs Racing) (3)  Carl Edwards (Ford, Roush Fenway Racing)

Cricket
India in West Indies:
3rd ODI in Gros Islet, St Lucia:
 186/7 (27/27 ov);  159/4 (21.5/22 ov). India win by 6 wickets (with 1 ball remaining) (D/L), lead 4-match series 2–1.

Football (soccer)
CONCACAF Gold Cup in United States:
Group A in Carson, California:
 1–0 
 1–2

Tennis
Wimbledon Championships in London, day 11: (seeding in parentheses)
Gentlemen's singles, semifinals:
Roger Federer  (2) def. Tommy Haas  (24) 7–6(3) 7–5 6–3
Federer advances to the final for the seventh straight year, the first ever player to do so, and will attempt to win a sixth Wimbledon title and record 15th Grand Slam tournament.
Andy Roddick  (6) def. Andy Murray  (3) 6–4, 4–6, 7–6 (7), 7–6 (5)
Roddick will meet Federer in a repeat of 2004 & 2005 finals.

Volleyball
FIVB World League:
Pool A:
 3–0 
Pool B:
 1–3 
Pool D:
 0–3 
 3–0 
Brazil win their 7th straight match and lead the group by 11 points. They can clinch a place in the final stage with another win tomorrow.

July 2, 2009 (Thursday)

Basketball
Mediterranean Games in Pescara, Italy:
Women's final:   70–54  
Women's bronze medal game:   77–62

Cycling
2009 European Road Championships:
Men's time trial  Marcel Kittel ,  Timofey Kritskiy ,  Rasmus Christian Quaade

Football (soccer)
Copa Libertadores Semifinals, second leg: (first leg result in parentheses)
Grêmio  2–2 (1–3)  Cruzeiro
Cruseiro win 5–3 on aggregate.

Tennis
Wimbledon Championships in London, day 10: (seeding in parentheses)
Ladies' singles, semifinals:
Venus Williams  (3) def. Dinara Safina  (1) 6–1 6–0
Serena Williams  (2) def. Elena Dementieva  (4) 6–7(4) 7–5 8–6
The Williams sisters will meet in a repeat of last year's final. This is their eighth match in a Grand Slam final, with Serena leading the series 5–2.

July 1, 2009 (Wednesday)

Cycling
2009 European Road Championships:
Women' s time trial  Ellen van Dijk ,  Emilia Fahlin ,  Marianne Vos

Football (soccer)
Copa Libertadores Semifinals, second leg: (first leg result in parentheses)
Nacional  1–2 (0–1)  Estudiantes
Estudiantes win 3–1 on aggregate.
Copa do Brasil Final, second leg: (first leg result in parentheses):
Internacional 2–2 (0–2) Corinthians
Corinthians win 4–2 on aggregate.

Tennis
Wimbledon Championships in London, day 9: (seeding in parentheses)
Gentlemen's singles, quarterfinals:
Roger Federer  [2] def. Ivo Karlović  [22] 6–3 7–5 7–6(3)
Andy Murray  [3] def. Juan Carlos Ferrero  7–5 6–3 6–2
Tommy Haas  [24] def. Novak Djokovic  [4] 7–5 7–6(6) 4–6 6–3
Andy Roddick  [6] def. Lleyton Hewitt  6–3 6–7(10) 7–6(1) 4–6 6–4

References 

7